Vaccinium stamineum, commonly known as deerberry, tall deerberry, squaw huckleberry, highbush huckleberry, buckberry, and southern gooseberry, is a species of flowering plant in the heath family. It is native to North America, including Ontario, the eastern and central United States, and parts of Mexico. It is most common in the southeastern United States.

Description
This species is quite variable in morphology. It is a shrub usually growing up to 1.5 meters (60 inches or 5 feet) tall, but reaching up to 3 meters (10 feet) at times. It has multiple twisted trunks covered in peeling reddish bark and is highly branched, tapering into thin twigs, some just a millimeter wide. It is deciduous, with alternately arranged leaves. The thin leaf blades are yellow-green, sometimes hairy or waxy in texture, especially on the undersides, and oval in shape with pointed tips and smooth edges. They are up to 7 centimeters (2.8 inches) long by 2.5 cm (1 inch) wide. The flowers are borne in hanging inflorescences from the leaf axils. Each flower has five green sepals and a bell-shaped corolla of five fused white petals about half a centimeter (0.2 inches) long. The long, yellow stamens protrude, bearing long, tubular anthers. The style is longer than the stamens. The fruit is a spherical berry about a centimeter wide. It is greenish or yellowish, often with a purple tinge.

Biology and ecology
This plant usually grows in dry, rocky habitat types in forests and fields, but it sometimes occurs in moist areas such as bogs and swamps. It grows in acidic, well-drained soils. It is wildfire-adapted and associated with fire-tolerant vegetation.

It establishes via seed, and commonly spreads via woody rhizomes, with a single plant forming what appears to be a thicket with many trunks. Because most of the mass of the plant is underground, it easily survives fire and the above-ground parts grow back.

The fruits are large for a Vaccinium species. They are an important food source for many kinds of wildlife. They are eagerly consumed by deer along with the twigs and foliage, the inspiration for the common names deerberry and buckberry. Smaller animals gather fallen fruits from the ground. They are food for many songbirds, ruffed grouse, bobwhite quail, wild turkey, foxes, raccoons, black bears, chipmunks, and squirrels.

The plant is pollinated by bees, the primary pollinator being Melitta americana. Bees dislodge, accumulate, and disperse pollen with buzz pollination while foraging nectar from the bell-shaped flowers. This species is a host to the blueberry maggot (Rhagoletis mendax) a pest of blueberry crops.

Uses
The fruit is edible for humans, and the taste has been described as tart, sour, bitter, or "sweet-spicy tasting, a little reminiscent of lady's perfume". It has long been collected in the southern United States for preserves and pie filling. Deerberries contain potent free radical scavenging activities. However, Deerberry is of the Vaccinium genus, which typically contains high amounts of Oxalates.

References

External links
Vaccinium stamineum. Flora of Missouri
photo of herbarium specimen at Missouri Botanical Garden, collected in Missouri in 1993

stamineum
Flora of the Northeastern United States
Flora of the Southeastern United States
Flora of Northeastern Mexico
Flora of Ontario
Flora of Texas
Flora of the Appalachian Mountains
Plants described in 1753
Taxa named by Carl Linnaeus